Dermochelyidae is a family of turtles which has seven extinct genera and one extant genus, including the largest living sea turtles.

Classification of known genera
The following list of dermochelyid species was published by Hirayama and Tong in 2003, unless otherwise noted.
 Arabemys crassiscutata
 †Eosphargis breineri
 Mesodermochelys undulatus
Subfamily Dermochelyinae
 †Cosmochelys
  Dermochelys coriacea – leatherback sea turtle
 †Psephophorus

Phylogeny 
Evers et al. (2019):

References

Bibliography

External links
Family Dermochelyidae (Leatherback turtles) from Turtles of the World by C.H. Ernst, R.G.M. Altenburg & R.W. Barbour

 
Taxa named by Leopold Fitzinger
Turtle families
Santonian first appearances
Extant Santonian first appearances